KTNO (620 kHz) is a commercial AM radio station licensed to Plano, Texas, and serving the Dallas/Fort Worth Metroplex. The station airs a Spanish Christian radio format known as "Radio Luz" and is owned by the Salem Media Group.  Studios and offices are on North Belt Line Road in Irving.  The transmitter is located on County Road 409 in McKinney.

History

KWFT in Wichita Falls (1939-1994)
The station originally had its start in Wichita Falls, Texas, as KWFT.  It signed on in 1939 on 620 kilocycles and broadcast in Wichita Falls until 1994.  KWFT was the first radio station to continuously operate in the city and was a regional channel that could be heard across a large geographical area of Texas and Oklahoma during the daytime. The station was a CBS Network affiliate.

On December 19, 1947, the Federal Communications Commission approved the sale of KWFT from Mr. and Mrs. Joe P. Carrigan, Laura Lou Carrigan and Mrs. Elizabeth Carrigan Simpson to Edward H. Rowley, H.J. Griffith and Kenyon Brown, operating as KWFT, Incorporated.

In 1953, KWFT joined other radio stations in the United States by plunging into the new medium of television. KWFT-TV signed on the air on March 1 and was the first television station in the Wichita Falls.  Just as its AM counterpart was a CBS radio affiliate, KWFT-TV was an affiliate of the CBS television network.  KWFT sold the TV station in 1956 at which time it became KSYD-TV and later KAUZ-TV in 1963, continuing as the CBS affiliate for the Wichita Falls-Lawton market.

KWFT Radio focused on local and national news, weather, farm reports and middle of the road music. However, as FM radio became more popular for music listening in the 1980s, it cut into KWFT's audience and advertising dollars, leading to the sale of the station in the mid-1990s to a new owner who had other plans for the station. KWFT signed off at 11:59 p.m. on December 24, 1994.

KAAM and KMKI in Dallas
About two years later, the 620 frequency formerly licensed to Wichita Falls returned to the airwaves licensed to Plano, a suburb in the Dallas-Fort Worth Metroplex.  The new call sign was KAAM.  It was owned by Collin County Radio L.C. and it aired an adult standards format.

KAAM was sold to The Walt Disney Company for $12 million and switched to the Radio Disney children's radio format on August 1, 1998.  KAAM was renamed KMKI (from Disney Character MicKey Mouse).  Until Radio Disney's move from Dallas to Burbank, California, KMKI was the network's flagship station.

In May 2014, Mediabase moved KMKI, along with other Radio Disney stations, to the Top 40/CHR panel, even though Radio Disney was considered a children's station.

On August 13, 2014, Disney put KMKI and 22 other Radio Disney stations up for sale, in order to focus on digital distribution of the Radio Disney network.  KMKI's affiliation was scheduled to be discontinued on or after September 26, 2014.  But the Disney Corp. decided to keep the programming on KMKI until it found a buyer.

KMKI has a license to broadcast a digital signal using iBiquity's "HD Radio" but suspended transmission in the months before the sale announcement.  Because the license to broadcast digital "HD Radio" is perpetual, the station could resume digital broadcasts at any time.

Sale to Salem

On June 5, 2015, the Salem Media Group announced it would acquire KMKI for $3 million. The station was sold to Salem on September 15, 2015.  As a result, the station discontinued its Radio Disney programming and went dark.  620 AM returned to the air on September 18, 2015, simulcasting the Christian radio programming of sister station KWRD-FM. On September 25, 2015, KMKI began simulcasting co-owned KVCE, broadcasting a business and financial news/talk format. On October 1, 2015, KMKI changed its call letters to KEXB (standing for “Experts in Business), and took over the business news/talk format from KVCE.  Radio Disney programming for the region later moved to KLUV's HD3 digital subchannel after the network's seven-month absence from the DFW radio market.

KEXB carried syndicated radio shows such as Bloomberg Radio and Ray Lucia.  It also aired brokered programming from financial planners who paid for time on the station and advertised their services.  SRN News began most hours.

Flip to Spanish Christian
In 2019, Salem announced it would sell co-owned KTNO to Catholic broadcaster Immaculate Heart Media, Inc.  On October 21, 2019, Salem discontinued its Financial News/Talk format on AM 620 and moved its Spanish Christian format known as "Radio Luz" from KTNO to KEXB. In addition, KEXB's call sign was switched to KTNO, while the KEXB call letters were warehoused on the former KTNO.

Signal
Unlike most of the area's FM stations, which transmit their signals from Cedar Hill, KTNO transmits its signal along County Road 409 in McKinney. Therefore, KTNO's AM signal is much stronger in much of the Dallas/Fort Worth Metroplex as well as the cities of Wichita Falls, and Greenville, to as far north as Ada, Oklahoma, but is considerably weaker south of the Metroplex.

References

External links
Radio Luz Dallas - Official website
 DFW Radio/TV History

Radio stations established in 1939
TNO
1939 establishments in Texas
Salem Media Group properties
TNO (AM)
TNO
Former subsidiaries of The Walt Disney Company